Siphonandra is a genus of flowering plants belonging to the family Ericaceae.

Its native range is Peru to Bolivia.

Species
Species:

Siphonandra boliviana 
Siphonandra elliptica 
Siphonandra magnifica 
Siphonandra nervosa 
Siphonandra santa-barbarense

References

Ericaceae
Ericaceae genera